Bonus Bait is a compilation album by British musician and DJ Andrew "Mr. Scruff" Carthy. It was released on 9 February 2009 by Ninja Tune, and features outtakes of his album Ninja Tuna.

In the United States, an MP3 double-album version of Ninja Tuna was released on 17 February, which included Bonus Bait as the second album.

Track listing

Personnel
 Mr. Scruff (Andrew Carthy) — all instruments, production
 Broke 'n' English (Delroy Pottinger and Johnny Wheeler) — vocals (3)
 Andreya Triana — vocals (6)
 Inja (Gareth Hue) and Skuff — vocals (9)

External links
 Mr. Scruff's official website

2009 compilation albums
Mr. Scruff albums
Ninja Tune albums